Peperomia rossii is a species of plant in the family Piperaceae.  It is endemic to Christmas Island, an Australian territory in the northeastern Indian Ocean.  Its specific epithet honours the Clunies-Ross family which established the Flying Fish Cove settlement on Christmas Island in 1888.

Description
Peperomia rossii is an epiphytic herb growing to about 50–100 mm in height.  It is glabrous, with creeping stems, rooting at the nodes, with an erect flowering shoot.  The leaves are usually opposite, elliptic, entire, and 10–30 mm long.  It carries many flowers.  The fruit is a round berry, less than 1 mm long.

Status and conservation
The plant is known only from the type collection made in 1898, and may be extinct.

References

Notes

Sources
 
 
 

rossii
Endemic flora of Christmas Island
Plants described in 1900
Taxa named by Edmund Gilbert Baker